Utvik is a village in Stryn Municipality in Vestland county, Norway. The village is located on the southern shore of the Nordfjorden. Utvik Church is located in this village. Historically, the village was an important trading post and ferry port with a regular route across the fjord. The ferry was stopped in 1936 when the new road was completed along the Nordfjorden connecting Utvik to the village of Stryn.

References

Villages in Vestland
Stryn